Laura Constance Netzel ( Pistolekors; 1 March 1839 — 10 February 1927) was a Finnish-born Swedish composer, pianist, conductor and concert organizer who sometimes used the pseudonym N. Lago. She was born in Rantasalmi, Finland, and was proud of her Finnish heritage throughout her life, even though she was just one year old when she moved permanently to Stockholm. Netzel studied piano with Mauritz Gisiko and Anton Door, voice with Julius Günther and composition with Wilhelm Heinze in Stockholm and Charles-Marie Widor in France.

Netzel was active in social causes, including support for poor women, children and workers. In 1866 she married professor Wilhelm Netzel of the Karolinska Institute. She died in Stockholm.

Works
Selected works: 
Stabat mater, Op. 45 (1890)
Cello Sonata, Op. 66 (1899)
Piano Trio, Op. 50
Piano Trio, Op. 68
Piano Trio, Op. 78
Piano Concerto in E minor, Op. 84

Reception
Savon Music Society has undertaken a project to publish works by Laura Netzel and other unknown female composers. In August 2021 they organized a Laura Netzel Music Festival in Rantasalmi where her songs, instrumental pieces and orchestral works were performed in a series of concerts. Performances included Piano Sonata E flat major, Ballad for Soprano and Orchestra (Op. 35, world premiere), and Piano Concerto E minor, Op. 84. The piano concerto was premiered at Mikkeli Music Festival in 2020.  An intense, high-Romantic, Lisztian work with a currency of grand rhetorical gestures and occasional moments of searching lyricism, it was reconstructed by the pianist Peter Friis Johansson who has since recorded it on the BIS label.

References

Further reading

External links

1839 births
1927 deaths
19th-century classical composers
20th-century classical composers
People from Mikkeli Province (Grand Duchy of Finland)
People from Rantasalmi
Swedish classical composers
Women classical composers
Swedish people of Finnish descent
20th-century Swedish women musicians
Swedish women classical composers
19th-century Swedish musicians
19th-century Swedish women musicians
20th-century women composers
19th-century women composers